Thomas Joseph Walsh (February 28, 1885 – March 16, 1963) was an American Major League Baseball player. He was a catcher who played for the Chicago Cubs in the 1906 season. He was born on February 28, 1885, in Davenport, Iowa. Walsh played two games in his career, going 0 for 1 with an average of .000. He died on March 16, 1963, in Naples, Florida.

External links
Baseball Reference
Baseball-Almanac page

1885 births
1963 deaths
Major League Baseball catchers
Chicago Cubs players
Baseball players from Iowa
Sportspeople from Davenport, Iowa